Petrichus is a genus of South American running crab spiders that was first described by Eugène Louis Simon in 1886.

Species
 it contains fourteen species, found in Brazil, Argentina, Ecuador, Chile, Peru, Colombia and on the Falkland Islands:
Petrichus anomalus (Mello-Leitão, 1938) – Argentina
Petrichus eremicus Griotti & Grismado, 2022 – Chile
Petrichus funebris (Nicolet, 1849) – Chile, Argentina
Petrichus griseus Berland, 1913 – Colombia, Ecuador, Peru
Petrichus junior (Nicolet, 1849) – Chile, Argentina
Petrichus marmoratus Simon, 1886 (type) – Argentina
Petrichus meridionalis (Keyserling, 1891) – Brazil
Petrichus niveus (Simon, 1895) – Chile, Argentina, Falkland Is.
Petrichus patagoniensis Griotti & Grismado, 2022 – Argentina
Petrichus roijunenti Griotti & Grismado, 2022 – Chile, Argentina
Petrichus sordidus Tullgren, 1901 – Argentina
Petrichus spira Griotti & Grismado, 2022 – Argentina
Petrichus tobioides Mello-Leitão, 1941 – Argentina
Petrichus tullgreni Simon, 1902 – Chile, Argentina, Falkland Is.

See also
 List of Philodromidae species

References

Araneomorphae genera
Philodromidae
Spiders of South America